Ngô Quyền (April 17, 898 – February 14, 944), often referred to as Tiền Ngô Vương (前吳王; "First King of Ngô"), was a warlord who later became the founding king of the Ngô dynasty of Vietnam. He reigned from 939 to 944. In 938, he defeated the Southern Han dynasty at the Battle of Bạch Đằng River north of modern Haiphong. The battle is usually remembered in Vietnamese national history as it ended 1,000 years of Chinese rule over Vietnam dating back to 111 BC under the Western Han dynasty. A central district in modern Haiphong is named after him.

Early life and career
Ngô Quyền was born in 898 AD in Đường Lâm (modern-day Sơn Tây District, Hanoi of northern Vietnam) during the Tang dynasty. He was the son of Ngô Mân, an influential official in Phong, Annan (today Phu Tho province). Ngô Mân's ancestor was Wu Ridai (Ngô Nhật Đại), a local tribal chief from Fuluzhou, Annan (Modern-day Ha Tinh Province). In 722, Wu Ridai and his family migrated to Aizhou (Modern-day Thanh Hoa Province) after the defeat of Mai Thúc Loan. According to the family's stele erected in 1631, the family claimed to has dated back to Hung kings period. Ngô Quyền's birth, according to Vietnamese tradition, that he was bathed with strange luminosity and three strangle black moles were seen on the baby's back, which were signs of his future greatness, and the mother named him "Quyền", meaning authority and power.

Since 905, the Tang dynasty lost control of Jinghai to locals and native chieftains. The Khúc family ruled Annam autonomy until in 930 the Chinese kingdom of Southern Han invaded Jinghai and removed the Khúc family from power. A formal vassal of the Khúc family, Dương Đình Nghệ launched a revolt in 931 that ousted the Chinese.

In 931, he served under Dương Đình Nghệ (the governor of Jinghai circuit/principality) and quickly rose through the military ranks and government administration; by 934, he was promoted to the post of military governor of Ái Châu. Dương Đình Nghệ loved his talent and gave him one of his daughters, Lady Dương, in marriage and placed him in charge of Ái Châu (Nghệ An province at present). The province was Dương Đình Nghệ's hometown and military power base. By giving Ngô Quyền command of this region Dương Đình Nghệ recognized Ngô Quyền's loyalty and talent.

After Dương Đình Nghệ was assassinated in a military coup in 937 by a usurper named Kiều Công Tiễn, he took control of the military and was well received. That same year, Ngô Quyền's forces defeated the rebel Kiều Công Tiễn and had him executed. This transpired into an opportunistic pretense for wrestling control of Annam by the new Southern Han regime due to its strategic geographical location. Ngô Quyền foresaw the Southern Han intention. He quickly mobilized the armed forces and made war preparations well in advance. His victory at the Battle of Bach Dang paved the way for Vietnamese independence.

Defeating the Southern Han

In 938, the Southern Han emperor Liu Yan dispatched an naval fleet to subdue Jinghai. Ngô Quyền calculated that the Southern Han would sail down the Bạch Đằng River to unload their troops right in the middle of Giao Châu to do the most damage. To prevent this incursion, Ngô Quyền strategized and ordered the waters of Bạch Đằng embedded with thousands of large wooden pikes hidden just beneath the rising tide water. He used boats with shallow drafts to instigate and lure the Southern Han toward the traps after the tide had risen. When the hundreds of Southern Han ships were punctured and caught against the deadly traps, Ngô Quyền led his forces in the attack. Hundreds of trapped ships were burned and sabotaged and thousands of Southern Han soldiers were killed, while some managed to retreat and were chased out relentlessly by the forces of An Nam. In the thick of battle, most of the Southern Han army, including the Admiral Liu Hongcao (the prince of the Southern Han Emperor), were killed.

King of Annam (Tĩnh Hải Quân)
After overthrowing the Chinese government in Vietnam and proclaimed as king, Ngô Quyền transferred the capital to Cổ Loa citadel, the capital of Âu Lạc, the ancient Yue kingdom, thus affirming the continuity of the traditions of the Lạc Việt people. He strengthened old rituals, and also provided feathered accessories, yellow banners, brass gongs, and deerskin drums for all the ancient dances with sword and battle axe, reminiscent of scenes depicted on Đông Sơn drums.

Quyền also imposed a new administrative hierarchy. He assigned a hundred mandarins, decided on the designs and colors of royal robes and hats for everyone, and appointed mandarins to different levels and functions. But his new realm quickly succumbed to prolonged civil conflict, beginning with internecine struggles between members of the Dương and Ngô families, who continued to alternate in power until the mid-960s. Ngô Quyền's immediate heirs proved unable to maintain a unified state. After his death in 944, Dương Tam Kha usurped the throne for a brief time, until Ngô Quyền's two sons, Ngô Xương Văn and Ngô Xương Ngập, finally established a joint rule, which lasted until the collapse of the royal family in 966.

Family
Father
Ngô Mân
Mother
Phùng Thị Tinh Phong
Wife
Dương Thị Ngọc 
Brother in law
Dương Tam Kha (?–980)
Children
Ngô Xương Ngập (?–954)
Ngô Xương Văn (935–965)
Ngô Nam Hưng
Ngô Càn Hưng

Legacy
The first history of Dai Viet by Lê Văn Hưu (13th century), Anthology of Palace Spirits of Lý Tế Xuyên (14th Century), and successive histories all recognized the importance of Ngô Quyền.

Image

References

Citations

Bibliography

Further reading
Nam Viet, Britannica
The first National King of Viet Nam: Ngo Quyen, Father of Vietnamese Independence

Ngô dynasty
Vietnamese kings
897 births
944 deaths
10th-century rulers in Asia
10th-century Vietnamese monarchs
People from Hanoi
Vietnamese monarchs
Founding monarchs